Franclim Pereira da Silva Maia Carvalho (born 30 March 1987) is a Portuguese football manager and former player who played as a winger. He is the current assistant manager of S.C. Braga.

Career
Born in Miranda do Corvo, Coimbra District, Carvalho was a player for lowly local sides, and retired at the age of 24 at Eirense to become an assistant coach at the club. In 2013, he was also an assistant at Penelense, before leaving in the following year to Paços de Ferreira, as a scout.

Carvalho worked at Nogueirense also as a scout, and became an assistant manager at Académica de Coimbra in 2015. He became a fitness coach at Famalicão in the following year, before moving abroad in 2017 to work as a fitness trainer at South Korean side Gwangju.

Back to Portugal in the 2017 summer, Carvalho was an assistant at Braga's under-17 and under-19 squads, before moving to Belenenses SAD under the same role in January 2020. On 11 January 2022, he replaced Filipe Cândido at the helm of the first team, signing a 18-month contract four days later. On his professional debut on 13 January, the side lost 1–0 at Famalicão, and finished the season relegated in last place; he then quoted the late manager Vítor Oliveira that "a new life begins a month or two from now".

On 19 May 2022, Carvalho left Belenenses SAD to be Artur Jorge's assistant on a two-year deal back at Braga.

Managerial statistics

References

External links

1987 births
Living people
People from Miranda do Corvo
Sportspeople from Coimbra District
Portuguese footballers
Association football wingers
Portuguese football managers
Primeira Liga managers
Belenenses SAD managers
Portuguese expatriate football managers
Portuguese expatriate sportspeople in South Korea